Maryland Route 468 (MD 468) is a state highway in the U.S. state of Maryland. The highway runs  from Snug Harbor Road in Shady Side north to MD 214 in Edgewater. MD 468 is a J-shaped route that connects Edgewater with the Chesapeake Bay communities of Galesville and Shady Side. The Galesville–Shady Side road was constructed as part of MD 255 in the 1920s. MD 468 was constructed north of MD 255 in the early 1930s. MD 255 was rerouted to enter Galesville and MD 468 was extended along MD 255's old route to Shady Side in the late 1940s.

Route description

MD 468 begins at an intersection with West Shady Side Road, which heads north toward the Capt. Salem Avery House, and Snug Harbor Road, which heads east toward Snug Harbor Park and the Idlewilde peninsula. The highway heads south as two-lane undivided Shady Side Road. MD 468 gradually curves to the west and meets the eastern end of MD 256 (Deale Churchton Road) as the highway passes north of the hamlet of Churchton. The highway continues west as Muddy Creek Road and intersects Sudley Road, which provides access to the historic home Sudley. MD 468 gradually curves to the north and crosses three streams that flow into the West River. The highway intersects MD 255 adjacent to the Quaker Burying Ground; the highway heads east as Galesville Road into the namesake village and west as Owensville Road. MD 468 passes to the west of three historic homes: Tulip Hill, which is accessed directly from the route; and Cedar Park and Parkhurst. After passing Old Muddy Creek Road, an old alignment, the road crosses over several branches of Muddy Creek within the Birds Mill Swamp. After leaving the swamp, the road passes Contee Wharf Road and South River Clubhouse Road. The former road leads east to the Smithsonian Environmental Research Center and the latter passes the historic meeting place of the South River Club. After passing another old alignment of MD 468 in Clydesdale Road, the road meets its northern terminus at MD 214 (Central Avenue) on the southeastern edge of Edgewater.

History
MD 468 originally included Muddy Creek Road from MD 255 north to Edgewater. The portion of MD 468 from MD 255 to Shady Side was part of MD 255 and the highway from the MD 255–MD 468 intersection east to Galesville was MD 393. The first work done along MD 468's modern course was grading work from the MD 255–MD 468 intersection south to Sudley Road in 1920. The gravel highway was completed between those intersections in 1921 and proposed to extend to the modern intersection with MD 256. The highway extended to Deep Creek Road on the south side of Shady Side in 1923. MD 255 was completed to Shady Side in 1929 and 1930. MD 468 was constructed in three sections. The first section from MD 253 (now MD 214) south to near Collins Road was started in 1930 and completed as a gravel road by 1933. The highway was extended south to Lansdale Road in 1932 and 1933. MD 468 was completed to MD 255 in 1933 and 1934. MD 468 was extended south along MD 255's route to Shady Side and MD 255 replaced MD 393 into Galesville in 1949. MD 468 originally followed what are now Old Muddy Creek Road and Clydesdale Road. Those curvaceous segments were replaced with the current straighter alignment in 1960. MD 468 once extended a short distance along Snug Harbor Road from its present terminus in Shady Side. The highway was retracted to its present terminus by 1987.

Junction list

Auxiliary route
MD 468B is the designation for an unnamed  spur from MD 468 east to a gate between Collins Road and South River Clubhouse Road near Edgewater.

See also

References

External links 

 MDRoads: MD 468
 Maryland Roads - MD 468

468
Maryland Route 468